Seat belt use rates in the United States have been rising steadily since 1983, from 14% to 90% in 2016. Seat belt use in the country in 2016 ranged from a minimum of 70.2% in New Hampshire to a maximum of 96.9% in Georgia. 19 states had use rates above 90%.

According to the National Highway Traffic Safety Administration's (NHTSA) 2008 survey, seat belt use remained lower among 16- to 24-year-olds than other age groups, with a rate of 77%, and also was lower among African Americans than other races, with a use rate of 75%. The survey also found that seat belt use continued to be higher among females (86%) than males (79%).

According to the NHTSA's 2013 survey, seat belt use in jurisdictions with stronger seatbelt enforcement laws continue to exhibit generally higher use rates than those with weaker laws.

Seat belt usage by year
The following list shows the national percentage of vehicle occupants using seat belts between 1983 and 2017:

The only years in which the rate did not increase over the previous year were 1994 when usage fell by eight percent, 1996 when usage fell by seven percent, 2006 when usage fell by one percent, and 2017 when usage fell by four tenths of one percent.

Seat belt usage by state/territory

See also
Seat belt use rates by country
 Transportation safety in the United States

References

External links
U.S. National Highway Traffic Safety Administration (NHTSA)

Automotive safety
Transportation in the United States
Seat belts